Tero Kalevi Aarnio (born 17 April 1984) is a motorcycle speedway rider from Finland.

Career
Aarnio was a member of Finland team at 2007 Speedway World Cup. This led to his signing for Berwick Bandits for the 2008 and 2009 seasons. He then joined Scunthorpe Scorpions in 2010 and 2011 and Workington Comets in 2012 and 2013 He then spent the 2014 and 2015 seasons with Glasgow and Newcastle respectively, the 2016 season with Scunthorpe and returned to Newcastle in 2018. In 2019 he rode for Birmingham.

After medalling six times at the Finnish Individual Speedway Championship he finally won the national title, when winning the 2020 Finnish Individual Speedway Championship to become champion of Finland.

In 2021 and 2022, he rode for Scunthorpe again, in the SGB Championship 2021 and the SGB Championship 2022. In 2022, he also rode for Tarnów in the Polish Speedway Second League.

Career details

World Championships 
 Team World Championship (Speedway World Team Cup and Speedway World Cup)
 2004 – 3rd place in Qualifying round 1
 2007 – 8th place
 2008 – 2nd place in Qualifying round 2
 Team U-21 World Championship
 2005 – 4th place in Qualifying Round 3

European Championships 
 Individual European Championship
 2005 – 17th place in Semi-Final C
 2007 – 16th place in Semi-Final B
 Individual U-19 European Championship
 2002 – 10th place in Semi-Final A
 2003 – 12th place in Semi-Final A
 European Pairs Championship
 2007 – Terenzano – 4th place (1 pt)

Domestic competitions 
 Individual Finnish Championship
 2001 – 12th place (4+0 pts)
 2002 – 7th place (9 pts)
 2003 – 10th place (6 pts)
 2004 – 3rd place (15 pts)
 2005 – 3rd place (44 pts)
 2006 – 9th place (7 pts)
 2008 – 5th place (9+1 pts)
 Individual Junior Finnish Championship
 2001 – 9th place (7 pts)
 2002 – Runner-up (17 pts)
 2003 – Runner-up (17 pts)
 2004 – Finnish Champion (25 pts)
 2005 – Finnish Champion (25 pts)

See also 
 Finland national speedway team

References 

1984 births
Living people
Finnish speedway riders
Berwick Bandits riders
Birmingham Brummies riders
Glasgow Tigers riders
Newcastle Diamonds riders
Scunthorpe Scorpions riders
Workington Comets riders